This following is a list of hereditary peers who were excluded from the House of Lords due to the House of Lords Act 1999.

Excluded hereditary peers
The following 653 hereditary peers had their entitlement to sit in the House of Lords removed by the House of Lords Act 1999, based on the Order of precedence in England and Wales, Scotland and Northern Ireland at the time of the passing of the act.

Hereditary peers given life peerages
The following ten peers were excluded from sitting in the House of Lords by virtue of their hereditary titles, and were not part of the 92 excepted hereditary peers. New life peerages were offered to hereditary peers of first creation (The Earl of Longford both as Baron Pakenham and a former Leader of the House of Lords, The Earl of Snowdon, The Lord Aldington and The Lord Erroll of Hale) and previous Leaders of the House of Lords (The Lord Carrington 1963–1964, The Earl of Longford 1964–1968, The Earl Jellicoe 1970–1973, The Lord Windlesham 1973–1974, The Lord Shepherd 1974–1976, The Lord Belstead 1988–1990 and The Viscount Cranborne 1994–1997, prior to the act Quintin Hogg who was a former Leader of the House 1960–1963 as The Viscount Hailsham, but he disclaimed the Viscountcy in 1963, but returned to the House as a Life Peer to take the office as Lord Chancellor and The Viscount Whitelaw who died on 1 July 1999,  had he lived he would have been eligible as a former Leader of the House of Lords 1983–1988 and as a first holder of his hereditary peerage.) to allow continued membership after the passage of the House of Lords Act 1999. Also two hereditary peers had been created life peers prior to their successions to their hereditary peerages and continued to sit in the House by virtue of their life peerages following the exclusion of hereditary peers.

See also 
List of hereditary peers in the House of Lords by virtue of a life peerage
List of hereditary peers elected under the House of Lords Act 1999

References

Notes

Citations

Sources 
 Bedford, M. (1999). Dod's Parliamentary Companion 1999. Westminster: Vacher Dod Publishing Ltd.
 Bedford, M. (2000). Dod's Parliamentary Companion 2000. Westminster: Vacher Dod Publishing Ltd.

Removed hereditary peers
Hereditary peers
Removed hereditary peers